William Percival Cutler (29 July 1900 – 13 August 1969) was an Australian rules footballer who played with Melbourne in the Victorian Football League (VFL).

Family
The son of George Phillip Cutler, and Julia Cutler, née Baker, William Percival Cutler was born at Bowenvale (near Timor), Victoria on 29 July 1900.

He married Cecelia Maria Drummy (1900–1969) in 1923.

He died at the Repatriation General Hospital, Heidelberg on 13 August 1969.

Football

Melbourne
Recruited from Ballarat, he played his first match (at the age of 29) for Melbourne against South Melbourne on 3 May 1930 in round one of the 1930 VFL season.

He played in the first fifteen matches of the 1930 season. On 23 August 1930, in the round fifteen match against Carlton, he was reported for three separate offences. He was found guilty of two of the three charges, and was suspended for a total of 12 matches:
 Striking Dinny Kelleher. The charge was sustained and Cutler was suspended for eight matches. (Kelleher was also reported for striking Cutler, and was also suspended for eight matches.)
 Attempting to strike Alex Duncan. The charge was sustained and Cutler was suspended for four matches.
 Attempting to strike Fred Gilby. The charge against Cutler was not sustained.

Former champion ruckman Jumbo Sharland's review of Melbourne's 1930 season had this to say of Cutler:

He played another seven senior matches for Melbourne in 1931, once he was free from his suspension.

Carlton
Although he was cleared from Melbourne to Carlton in 1932, he never played for Carlton.

Military service
He enlisted in the Second AIF in October 1939, and was discharged from the army (on medical grounds) in January 1943.

Notes

References
 
 
 World War Two Service Record: Private William Percival Cutler (VX3307).
 World War Two Nominal Roll: Private William Percival Cutler (VX3307).

External links 
 
 Bill Cutler, Demonwiki.

1900 births
1969 deaths
Australian rules footballers from Victoria (Australia)
Melbourne Football Club players
Australian Army personnel of World War II
Australian Army soldiers